James Brady (1940–2014) was an assistant to the U.S. President and the fifteenth White House Press Secretary under President Ronald Reagan.

James Brady or Jim Brady may also refer to:
 James Brady (columnist) (1928–2009), American celebrity columnist
 James Brady (criminal) (1875–1904), American criminal
 James Brady (Medal of Honor) (1842–1904), American soldier
 James Brady (SS) (born 1920), one of two Irishmen known to have served in the Waffen-SS during World War II
 Jimmy Brady (1901–1976), Irish water polo player
 James Charles Brady (1876–1962), Canadian politician, school principal and teacher
 James Dennis Brady (1843–1900), U.S. Representative from Virginia
 James H. Brady (1862–1918), Republican politician from Idaho who served as the state's governor and a U.S. senator representing the state
 James J. Brady (Illinois official) (born 1878), Illinois state auditor
 James Joseph Brady (1944–2017), American lawyer
 James M. Brady,  American journalist and an expert in digital journalism
 James P. Brady (born 1908), Canadian Métis political leader
 James T. Brady (1815–1869), American lawyer
 Jim Brady (baseball) (born 1936), American economist, retired university educator and administrator, and a former left-handed pitcher in professional baseball
 Jim Brady (boxer) (died 1980), Scottish professional bantam/feather/lightweight boxer
 Jim Brady (quarterback) (1907–1984), American football player and broadcasting entrepreneur
 Jim Brady (rugby league), former professional rugby league footballer
 Jim Brady (sailor) (born 1963), American former competitive sailor
 Jim Brady, a member of The Sandpipers
 Diamond Jim Brady (1856–1917), American businessman, financier and philanthropist of the Gilded Age